Vietnamese singer-songwriter Sơn Tùng M-TP began his career as an independent artist online before finding success with "Cơn mưa ngang qua", his debut single released in 2012. It was Tùng's 2013 single, "Em của ngày hôm qua", that helped him to reach mainstream status. Both songs earned him the monthly honors from music chart television program Favorite Song. "Cơn mưa ngang qua" also received a Zing Music Award for R&B Song of the Year. In 2014, he was disqualified from Favorite Song and Green Wave Award nominations due to accusations of plagiarism toward many of his songs' instrumental tracks.

The singer later turned to acting in the feature film Dandelion (2014), a role which gave him a respected Golden Kite Prize for Young Prominent Actor. The film's soundtrack, "Chắc ai đó sẽ về", and his other single "Âm thầm bên em", respectively won a WeChoice Award for Song of the Year and a Green Wave Award for Single of the Year. At the 2015 MTV Europe Music Awards, Tùng won Best Southeast Asian Act and received Best Asian Act nomination. The three following years saw him win a prestigious Dedication Music Award for Artist of the Year in 2016, a Mnet Asian Music Award for Vietnamese Breakout Artist in 2017, another Green Wave Award for Single of the Year (for his song "Lạc trôi") and a WeChoice Award for Breakout Artist in 2018.

Since 2015, Tùng has been included on the Green Wave Awards' top five Most Favorite Singers (Top Hit board) list on three consecutive occasions. WeChoice Awards named him one of their five Inspiration Ambassadors in 2015 and one of the ten Most Influential People of 2014 and 2017. Forbes Vietnam also included Tùng in their 2018 edition of 30 Under 30 list. In addition to music and film recognition, he was given a 2017 Vietnamese Elle Style Award for Most Stylish Male Singer. Other international awards he has received are a Big Apple Music Award and a WebTVAsia Award.

Big Apple Music Awards
The Big Apple Music Awards Foundation created the Big Apple Music Awards in 2004 to honor artists from Central Asia, Caucasus and the Middle East. Tùng has received one award.

|-
! scope="row"| 2016
| Sơn Tùng M-TP
| Best Vietnamese Male Artist
|

Dedication Music Awards
The Dedication Music Awards is the annual awards ceremony for excellence in the Vietnamese music industry. Thể thao & Văn hóa newspaper created the awards in 2004. They have been dubbed "the Vietnamese Grammys" by the press. Tùng has earned one award out of five nominations.

|-
! scope="row" rowspan="4"| 2016
| Sơn Tùng M-TP
| Singer of the Year
| 
|-
| "Âm thầm bên em"
| Song of the Year
| 
|-
| M-TP Ambition - Chuyến bay đầu tiên
| Concert of the Year
| 
|-
| "Buông đôi tay nhau ra"
| Music Video of the Year
| 
|-
! scope="row" | 2018
| "Lạc trôi"
| Music Video of the Year
| 
|-

Elle Style Awards (Vietnam)
The Elle Style Awards is an awards ceremony hosted annually by Elle Vietnam magazine to honor achievement in the fields of style, design, and entertainment. Tùng has received one award from two nominations.

|-
! scope="row"| 2016
| rowspan="3"| Sơn Tùng M-TP
| Most Stylish Male Singer
| 
|-
! scope="row"| 2017
| Most Stylish Male Singer
| 
|-
|-
! scope="row"| 2018
| Most Stylish Male Singer
|

Favorite Song
Favorite Song was a music chart program broadcast on Vietnam Television's networks. Tùng has earned two awards.
 

|-
! scope="row"| 2012
| "Cơn mưa ngang qua"
| Song of the Month (October)
| 
|-
! scope="row"| 2014
| "Em của ngày hôm qua"
| Song of the Month (February)
|

Golden Kite Prizes
The Golden Kite Prize is an accolade that recognizes excellence in film and television. It is the Vietnamese equivalent of an Academy Award. Tùng has been honored once.

|-
! scope="row"| 2015
| Dandelion
| Young Prominent Actor
|

Golden Ochna Awards  
The Golden Ochna Awards is a Vietnamese award show presented by Người Lao Động newspaper, which honors the year's biggest achievements in music, film, television, and theatre. Tùng has received four nominations.

|-
!scope="row"| 2016
| "Âm thầm bên em"
| Pop Male Singer
| 
|-
! scope="row"| 2017
| "Chúng ta không thuộc về nhau"
| Pop Male Singer
| 
|-
! scope="row" rowspan="2" | 2018
| rowspan="2" | "Lạc trôi"
| Pop Male Singer
| 
|-
| Music Video
|

Green Wave Awards
The Green Wave Awards is a music ceremony in Vietnam, held annually since 1997 by the radio show Green Wave. Tùng has won seven awards out of nine nominations.

|-
! scope="row" rowspan="3"| 2015
| rowspan="2"| Sơn Tùng M-TP
| Top 5 Most Favorite Singers – Top Hit
| 
|-
| Top 10 Songwriters that have the Most Favorite Song
| 
|-
| "Âm thầm bên em"
| Single of the Year
| 
|-
! scope="row" | 2017
| rowspan="2"| Sơn Tùng M-TP
| Top 5 Most Favorite Singers – Top Hit
| 
|-
! scope="row" rowspan="5" | 2018
| Top 5 Most Favorite Singers – Top Hit
| 
|-
| rowspan="4" | "Lạc trôi"
| Top 10 Most Favorite Songs (Songwriters)
| 
|-
| Single of the Year
| 
|-
| Sensational Song
| 
|-
| Most Excellent Production and Mix
| 
|-
! scope="row" | 2019  
| "Chạy ngay đi"
| Single of the Year
|

I-Magazine Fashion Face Awards 
The I-Magazine Fashion Face Awards are presented by I-Magazine and Behance to award the best faces in fashion. According to the official website, they were expected to be "one of the most influential references in the industry." Tùng has received one nomination.

|-
! scope="row"| 2016
| Sơn Tùng M-TP (as Nguyen Thanh Tung)
| Asian Male
|

Keeng Young Awards
Established in 2017 by music streaming website Keeng and music on hold service Imuzik, the Keeng Young Awards recognize musicians under thirty for their achievements in the industry. Tùng has won twice.

|-
! scope="row" rowspan="4"| 2017
| rowspan="2"| Sơn Tùng M-TP
| Most Excellent Artist 
| 
|-
| Most Favorite Male Artist
| 
|-
| "Lạc trôi"
| Top 5 Most Favorite On-Hold Music Songs
| 
|-
| "Lạc trôi (Remix)" <small>(featuring TripleD)
| Best Dance Track
|

Men of the Year
The annual Men of the Year awards were created by Thể thao Văn hóa và Đàn Ông magazine in 2005 to recognize the most influential men in a variety of fields. Tùng has earned one award.

|-
! scope="row"| 2015
| Sơn Tùng M-TP
| Team of the Year
|

Mnet Asian Music Awards
The Mnet Asian Music Awards is one of the major K-pop music awards ceremonies held annually by CJ E&M through its music channel Mnet. Tùng has won one award.

|-
! scope="row" | 2017
| Sơn Tùng M-TP
| Vietnamese Breakout Artist with Close-Up
|

MTV Europe Music Awards
The MTV Europe Music Awards were established in 1994 by MTV Europe to award music videos from European and international artists. Tùng has received one award from two nominations.

|-
! scope="row" rowspan="2"| 2015
| rowspan="2"| Sơn Tùng M-TP
| Best Southeast Asian Act
| 
|-
| Best Asian Act
|

Ngôi sao của năm
Ngôi sao của năm (Star of the Year) were awards, voted on by the readers of Ngoisao.net, given to celebrities in different fields of  entertainment. Tùng has won once.

|-
! scope="row"| 2014
| Sơn Tùng M-TP
| Handsome Man of the Year
|

Nhân vật truyền lửa
Nhân vật truyền lửa (Inspirational Person) was an award given to individuals who have made important contributions to society. It was held once to mark the 10-year anniversary of television channel VTV6. Tùng has received one award.

|-
! scope="row"| 2017
| Sơn Tùng M-TP
| Culture and Entertainment
|

SBS PopAsia Awards
The SBS PopAsia Awards are presented annually by the Australian music show SBS PopAsia to honor the Asian music industry. Tùng has been nominated once.

|-
! scope="row"| 2017
| Sơn Tùng M-TP
| Best Solo Star
|

The Magic Box
The Magic Box was an accolade bestowed by former news website Thebox.vn. Tùng has won once.

|-
! scope="row"| 2015
| Sơn Tùng M-TP
| Best Male Singer
|

V Live Awards 
The V Live Awards are given annually by the live streaming app V Live, to its notable Vietnamese users. Tùng has received one award.

|-
! scope="row"| 2018
| Sơn Tùng M-TP
| Best V Star
|

VTV Awards
The VTV Awards were created by Vietnam Television in 2014 to award individuals and programs that have contributed to the network. Tùng has received two nominations.

|-
! scope="row"| 2016
| rowspan="3"| Sơn Tùng M-TP
| Most Impressive Singer
| 
|-
! scope="row" |2017
| Most Impressive Singer
| 
|-
! scope="row" |2019
| Most Impressive Singer
|

WebTVAsia Awards
The WebTVAsia Awards honor outstanding achievements in Asian digital creative content. Tùng has received one award.

|-
! scope="row"|2016
| "Chúng ta không thuộc về nhau"
| Most Popular Video in Vietnam
|

WeChoice Awards
The WeChoice Awards (formerly stylized as We Choice Awards) were established in 2015 by VCCorp to honor notable events, individuals and products of the year. Tùng has earned eleven awards out of sixteen nominations.

|-
! scope="row" rowspan="5"| 2015
| rowspan="3"| Sơn Tùng M-TP
| Top 5 Inspiration Ambassadors voted by the Appraisal Board
| 
|-
| Top 10 Most Influential People of 2014
| 
|-
| Young Male Artist of the Year
| 
|-
| Sơn Tùng M-TP and SlimV
| Collaboration of the Year
| 
|-
| "Chắc ai đó sẽ về"
| Song of the Year
| 
|-
! scope="row" rowspan="5"| 2016
| Sơn Tùng M-TP
| Top 5 Most Influential Artists of 2015 
| 
|-
| "Âm thầm bên em"
| Inspirational Playlist
| 
|-
| "Không phải dạng vừa đâu"
| Inspirational Playlist
| 
|-
| "Thái Bình mồ hôi rơi"
| Inspirational Playlist
| 
|-
| "Chắc ai đó sẽ về"
| Inspirational Playlist
| 
|-
! scope="row" rowspan="2"| 2017
| "Mình thích thì mình làm thôi"
| Viral Word or Catchphrase of the Year
| 
|-
| "Tha thu"
| Viral Word or Catchphrase of the Year
| 
|-
! scope="row" rowspan="4"| 2018
| rowspan="2"| Sơn Tùng M-TP
| Top 10 Most Influential People of 2017
| 
|-
| Breakout Artist
| 
|-
| "Lạc trôi"
| Most Favorite Music Video
| 
|-
| m-tp M-TP
| Most Favorite Album
| 
|-
! scope="row" rowspan="1"| 2019
| "Chạy ngay đi"
| Music Video of the Year
| 
|-
! scope="row" rowspan="1"| 2021
| "Chúng ta của hiện tại"
| Music Video of the Year
|

Zing Music Awards
The Zing Music Awards is an annual music awards show founded by the music streaming site Zing MP3. Tùng has been nominated thirteen times and has won three awards.

|-
! scope="row"| 2013
| "Cơn mưa ngang qua"
| R&B Song of the Year
| 
|-
! scope="row"| 2014
| "Nắng ấm xa dần"
| Most Favorite Soul/R&B Song 
| 
|-
! scope="row" rowspan="2"| 2015
| rowspan="6"| Sơn Tùng M-TP
| New Artist of the Year
| 
|-
| Most Favorite Male Artist 
| 
|-
! scope="row" rowspan="2"| 2016
| Artist of the Year
| 
|-
| Most Favorite Male Artist 
| 
|-
! scope="row" rowspan="10"| 2018
| Artist of the Year
| 
|-
| Most Favorite Male Artist
| 
|-
| rowspan="3"| "Lạc trôi"
| Song of the Year
| 
|-
| Music Video of the Year
| 
|-
| Most Favorite Dance/Electronic Song
| 
|-
| "Nơi này có anh"
| Most Favorite Pop/Ballad Song
| 
|-
| "Remember Me (SlimV 2017 Mix)"
| Most Favorite Rap/Hip-hop Song
|

Notes

References

Sơn Tùng M-TP